Port Moody—Westwood—Port Coquitlam was a federal electoral district in British Columbia, Canada, that was represented in the House of Commons of Canada from 2004 to 2015.

Demographics

Consisting of the following parts of the Greater Vancouver Regional District:

(a) the villages of Anmore and Belcarra;

(b) the City of Port Coquitlam;

(c) the following parts of Subdivision A:

(i) that part lying easterly of Indian Arm and the Indian River and northerly of the City of Coquitlam and the Village of Anmore;

(ii) that part on the north shoreline of Burrard Inlet within the City of Port Moody;

(iii) Boulder Island;

(d) that part of the City of Coquitlam lying northerly of Highway No. 7A (Barnet Highway, Lougheed Highway);

(e) that part of the City of Port Moody lying northerly of a line described as follows: commencing at the intersection of the easterly limit of said city with Guildford Drive; thence westerly along said drive, its production and Murray Street to the southerly production of the most southeasterly point of Port Moody in Burrard Inlet (at Inlet Park); thence northerly along said production to said port; thence generally westerly along said port to the westerly limit of said city; and

(f) Coquitlam Indian Reserve No. 2.

History

This riding was created by the 2003 Representation Order from Port Moody—Coquitlam—Port Coquitlam riding.

The 2012 electoral redistribution will see this riding dissolved into Coquitlam—Port Coquitlam and Port Moody—Coquitlam for the 2015 election.

Members of Parliament

Current Member of Parliament

Its Member of Parliament was The Honourable James Moore, a former broadcaster. He was first elected in 2000, and is a member of the Conservative Party of Canada. He was re-elected in the 2004, 2006, and 2008 elections. Moore was the Secretary of State for Official Languages, Pacific Gateway and the Vancouver-Whistler Olympics before the cabinet shuffle announced on October 30, 2008, when he was appointed Minister of Canadian Heritage and Official Languages.

Election results

See also
 List of Canadian federal electoral districts
 Past Canadian electoral districts

References

 Expenditures - 2004
 Expenditures - 2000
 Riding history from the Library of Parliament

Notes

External links
 Website of the Parliament of Canada

Former federal electoral districts of British Columbia
Federal electoral districts in Greater Vancouver and the Fraser Valley
Politics of Coquitlam
Port Coquitlam
Port Moody